Paravilla syrtis is a species of bee flies (insects in the family Bombyliidae) found in the arid regions of western North America.

References

Paravilla
Articles created by Qbugbot
Insects described in 1887